Hof University, full name , is a public non-profit business, media and technical vocational university founded in 1994 in Upper Franconia, Bavaria, Germany.

References 

Hof
Hof, Bavaria
Educational institutions established in 1994
Universities and colleges in Bavaria
1994 establishments in Germany